The Czechoslovak National Badminton Championships was a tournament organized to crown the best badminton players in Czechoslovakia. They were held between 1961 and 1992, and were succeeded by the Czech and the Slovak National Badminton Championships.

Past winners

Team champions

Junior champions

References
Badminton Europe

Badminton in Czechoslovakia
National badminton championships
Sports competitions in Czechoslovakia
1961 establishments in Czechoslovakia
1992 disestablishments in Czechoslovakia
Recurring sporting events established in 1961